"Voces" is a song by Spanish singer Ruth Lorenzo. It was released on 14 October 2016 as a digital download in Spain. The song has peaked to number 52 on the Spanish Singles Chart.

Track listing

Chart performance

Weekly charts

Release history

References

2016 singles
2016 songs
Ruth Lorenzo songs